The 2002 European Marathon Cup was the 7th edition of the European Marathon Cup of athletics and were held in Munich, Germany, inside of the 2002 European Championships.

Results

See also
2002 European Athletics Championships – Men's Marathon
2002 European Athletics Championships – Women's Marathon

References

External links
 EAA web site

European Marathon Cup
European
International athletics competitions hosted by Germany
2002 in German sport
Marathon